Tomáš Konečný (born 11 October 1973 in Olomouc) is a Czech former racing cyclist, who competed at the 2000 Summer Olympics. He currently works as a directeur sportif for UCI Continental team .

Major results

1996
1st Stage 4 Commonwealth Bank Classic
1st Stage 6 Sachsen Tour
1997
2nd GP Kranj
3rd Road race, National Road Championships
1998
1st Overall Volta ao Algarve
1st Stages 3 & 6
1st Stage 6 Tour de Beauce
3rd Philadelphia International Cycling Classic
1999
1st  Road race, National Road Championships
1st Stage 2 Vuelta a La Rioja
2nd Overall Herald Sun Tour
1st Stages 7 & 11
2000
1st Poreč Trophy 5
1st Overall Tour de Beauce
1st Prologue
2001
1st Stage 16 Vuelta a España
9th Road race, UCI Road World Championships
2002
2nd Road race, National Road Championships
6th Milan–San Remo
2003
2nd Overall Jadranska Magistrala
1st Stage 3
2nd Overall Niedersachsen-Rundfahrt
1st Stage 4
3rd Overall Peace Race
1st Stage 8
3rd Overall Tour de Beauce
1st Stage 4

References

External links 

 Profile at sports-reference.com

1973 births
Living people
Czech male cyclists
Czech Vuelta a España stage winners
Olympic cyclists of the Czech Republic
Cyclists at the 2000 Summer Olympics
Sportspeople from Olomouc